Sfaka is a mountain village in Crete, situated between Agios Nikolaos and Sitia. Sfaka belongs to the Municipality of Sitia.

It has a long history, and archaeological monuments including the meta-Byzantine icons of "Stavrosis" and the Church "Panagia" in the "Kato Chorio". Sfaka now has 200 - 250 inhabitants, but in the past its population was greater than 2000. Recently, Sfaka has been considered a tourist destination for its port, Mochlos.

References

Populated places in Lasithi